Naji (also transliterated as Nagy in Egyptian Arabic and Naci (Turkish)) is an Arabic male given name, which is derived from the Arabic verb to survive. It is also a surname.

Given name
 Najee Harris (born March 9, 1998), American football running back for the Pittsburgh Steelers.
 Naji al-Ali (1938–1987), Palestinian cartoonist, noted for political criticism of Israel
Nagy Habib (born 1952), Egyptian professor, surgeon
 Naji Hakim (born 1955), French citizen of Lebanese origin, organist and composer
 Naji Majrashi (born 1982), Saudi footballer
 Naji Sabri (born 1951), Iraqi diplomat, Foreign Minister under Saddam Hussein
 Naji Shawkat (1893–1980), Iraqi politician, Prime Minister 1932–33
 Naji Shushan (born 1981), Libyan footballer
 Naji al-Suwaidi (1882–1942), Iraqi politician, Prime Minister 1929–30
 Naji Talib (1917–2012), Iraqi politician, Prime Minister 1966–67
 Naji Mohamed Abdo, PhD. (born 1970), Egyptian politician, Former Nominated Minister of Civil Aviation 2012-2013

Surname
 Aziz Abdul Naji (born 1975), Algerian prisoner at Guantanamo Bay
 Fehmi Naji (born 1928), Australian Muslim leader
 Ismail Qasim Naji, Somali military leader
 Kamal Naji (1951–2009), Palestinian politician
Oras Sultan Naji (1962-2015), Yemeni politician
 Reza Naji (born 1942), Iranian actor
 Kasra Naji, Iranian journalist

See also
Nnaji, surname
Noji, surname
Nagy

References

Arabic-language surnames
Arabic masculine given names